Trivial objections (also referred to as hair-splitting, nothing but objections, barrage of objections and banal objections) is an informal logical fallacy where irrelevant and sometimes frivolous objections are made to divert the attention away from the topic that is being discussed. This type of argument is called a "quibble" or "quillet". Trivial objections are a special case of red herring.

The fallacy often appears when an argument is difficult to oppose. The person making a trivial objection may appear ready to accept the argument in question, but at the same time they will oppose it in many different ways. These objections can appear in the form of lists, hypotheticals, and even accusations.

Such objections themselves may be valid, but they fail to confront the main argument under consideration. Instead, the objection opposes a small, irrelevant part of the main argument. The fallacy is committed because of this diversion; it is fallacious to oppose a point on the basis of minor and incidental aspects, rather than responding to the main claim.

These objections are often used to not address the merit of an argument but rather to oppose them from a technicality.

Example:
Tom is using a barrage of objections:

Amy: Tomatoes are fruit, not vegetable.
Tom: Tomatoes can't be fruit. They don't grow on trees.
Amy: But pineapples also don't grow on trees and are fruit.
Tom: Tomatoes still can't be fruit. They are used in salads.
Amy: Apples are also used in salads and are fruit.
Tom: Tomatoes still can't be fruit. They are of botanical order Solanales.
(etc...)

See also

 Straw man

References

Further reading

Informal fallacies